In mathematics and its applications, classical Sturm–Liouville theory is the theory of real second-order linear ordinary differential equations of the form:

All homogeneous (i.e. with the right-hand side equal to zero) second-order linear ordinary differential equations can be reduced to this form. In addition, the solution  is typically required to satisfy some boundary conditions at extreme values of x. Each such equation together with its boundary conditions constitutes a Sturm–Liouville problem.

In the simplest case where all coefficients are continuous on the finite closed interval  and  has continuous derivative, a function y = y(x) is called a solution if it is continuously differentiable and satisfies the equation at every .

The function , sometimes denoted , is called the weight or density function. 

This terminology is because the solutions correspond to the eigenvalues and  eigenfunctions of a Hermitian differential operator in an appropriate Hilbert space of functions with inner product defined using the weight function. Sturm–Liouville theory studies the existence and asymptotic behavior of the eigenvalues, the corresponding qualitative theory of the eigenfunctions and their completeness in the function space.

This theory is important in applied mathematics, where Sturm–Liouville problems occur very frequently, particularly when dealing with separable linear partial differential equations. For example, in quantum mechanics, the one-dimensional time-independent Schrödinger equation is a Sturm–Liouville problem.

The main result of Sturm–Liouville theory states that, for the regular Sturm–Liouville problem,,:

 The eigenvalues  are real and can be numbered so that 
 The normalized eigenfunctions form an orthonormal basis under the w-weighted inner product in the Hilbert space . That is: where  is the Kronecker delta.
The theory is named after Jacques Charles François Sturm (1803–1855) and Joseph Liouville (1809–1882).

Reduction to Sturm–Liouville form 
The differential equation is said to be in Sturm–Liouville form or self-adjoint form. Some examples are below.

Bessel equation

Legendre equation

which can easily be put into Sturm–Liouville form, since , so the Legendre equation is equivalent to

Example using an integrating factor

Divide throughout by :

Multiplying throughout by an integrating factor of

gives

which can be easily put into Sturm–Liouville form since

so the differential equation is equivalent to

Integrating factor for general second-order homogenous equation

Multiplying through by the integrating factor

and then collecting gives the Sturm–Liouville form:

or, explicitly:

Sturm–Liouville equations as self-adjoint differential operators 
The mapping defined by:

can be viewed as a linear operator  mapping a function  to another function , and it can be studied in the context of functional analysis. In fact, equation can be written as

This is precisely the eigenvalue problem; that is, one seeks eigenvalues  and the corresponding eigenvectors  of the  operator. The proper setting for this problem is the Hilbert space  with scalar product

In this space  is defined on sufficiently smooth functions which satisfy the above regular boundary conditions. Moreover, L is a self-adjoint operator:

This can be seen formally by using integration by parts twice, where the boundary terms vanish by virtue of the boundary conditions. It then follows that the eigenvalues of a Sturm–Liouville operator are real and that eigenfunctions of  corresponding to different eigenvalues are orthogonal. However, this operator is unbounded and hence existence of an orthonormal basis of eigenfunctions is not evident. To overcome this problem, one looks at the resolvent

where  is not an eigenvalue. Then, computing the resolvent amounts to solving a nonhomogeneous equation, which can be done using the variation of parameters formula. This shows that the resolvent is an integral operator with a continuous symmetric kernel (the Green's function of the problem). As a consequence of the Arzelà–Ascoli theorem, this integral operator is compact and existence of a sequence of eigenvalues  which converge to 0 and eigenfunctions which form an orthonormal basis follows from the spectral theorem for compact operators. Finally, note that

are equivalent, so we may take  with the same eigenfunctions.

If the interval is unbounded, or if the coefficients have singularities at the boundary points, one calls  singular. In this case, the spectrum no longer consists of eigenvalues alone and can contain a continuous component. There is still an associated eigenfunction expansion (similar to Fourier series versus Fourier transform). This is important in quantum mechanics, since the one-dimensional time-independent Schrödinger equation is a special case of a Sturm–Liouville equation.

Application to inhomogeneous second-order boundary value problems
Consider a general inhomogeneous second-order linear differential equation  for given functions . As before, this can be reduced to the Sturm–Liouville form : writing a general Sturm–Liouville operator as:

one solves the system:

It suffices to solve the first two equations, which amounts to solving , or

A solution is:

Given this transformation, one is left to solve:

Here, the Sturm–Liouville theory comes in play: indeed, a large class of functions  can be expanded in terms of a series of orthonormal eigenfunctions  of the associated Liouville operator with corresponding eigenvalues :

Then a solution to the proposed equation is evidently:

This solution will be valid only over the open interval , and may fail at the boundaries.

Example: Fourier series 
Consider the Sturm–Liouville problem:

For boundary conditions, we take for example:

Observe that if  is any integer, then the function

is a solution with eigenvalue . We know that the solutions of a Sturm–Liouville problem form an orthogonal basis, and we know from Fourier series that this set of sinusoidal functions is an orthogonal basis. Since orthogonal bases are always maximal (by definition) we conclude that the Sturm–Liouville problem in this case has no other eigenvectors.

Given the preceding, let us now solve the inhomogeneous problem

with the same boundary conditions . In this case, we must expand  as a Fourier series. The reader may check, either by integrating  or by consulting a table of Fourier transforms, that we thus obtain

This particular Fourier series is troublesome because of its poor convergence properties. It is not clear a priori whether the series converges pointwise. We mention for the interested reader that in this case we may rely on a result which says that Fourier series converge at every point of differentiability, and at jump points (the function x, considered as a periodic function, has a jump at ) converges to the average of the left and right limits (see convergence of Fourier series).

Therefore, by using formula, we obtain the solution:

In this case, we could have found the answer using antidifferentiation, but this is no longer useful in most cases when the differential equation is in many variables.

Application to partial differential equations

Normal modes 
Certain partial differential equations can be solved with the help of Sturm–Liouville theory. Suppose we are interested in the vibrational modes of a thin membrane, held in a rectangular frame, . The equation of motion for the vertical membrane's displacement,  is given by the wave equation:

The method of  separation of variables  suggests looking first for solutions of the simple form . For such a function  the partial differential equation becomes . Since the three terms of this equation are functions of  separately, they must be constants. For example, the first term gives  for a constant .

The functions  form a basis for the Hilbert space of (generalized) solutions of the wave equation; that is, an arbitrary solution  can be decomposed into a sum of these modes, which vibrate at their individual frequencies . This representation may require a convergent infinite sum.

Second-order linear equation 
For a linear second-order in one spatial dimension and first-order in time of the form:

Separating variables, we assume that  Then our above partial differential equation may be written as:

where

The first of these equations must be solved as a Sturm–Liouville problem in terms of the eigenfunctions  and eigenvalues . The second of these equations can be analytically solved once the eigenvalues are known.

where

Representation of solutions and numerical calculation 
The Sturm–Liouville differential equation with boundary conditions may be solved analytically, which can be exact or provide an approximation, by the Rayleigh–Ritz method, or by the matrix-variational method of Gerck et al.

Numerically, a variety of methods are also available. In difficult cases, one may need to carry out the intermediate calculations to several hundred decimal places of accuracy in order to obtain the eigenvalues correctly to a few decimal places.

 Shooting methods
 Finite difference method
 Spectral parameter power series method

Shooting methods 

This strategy is not applicable for locating complex eigenvalues.

Spectral parameter power series method 

Further, all solutions are linear combinations of these two solutions.

The resulting iterated integrals are now applied as coefficients in the following two power series in λ:

Next one chooses coefficients  and  so that the combination  satisfies the first boundary condition. For numerical work one may truncate this series to a finite number of terms, producing a calculable polynomial in  whose roots are approximations of the sought-after eigenvalues.

When , this reduces to the original construction described above for a  solution linearly independent to a given one. The representations and  also have theoretical applications in Sturm–Liouville theory.

Construction of a nonvanishing solution
The SPPS method can, itself, be used to find a starting solution . Then the constant function 1 is a nonvanishing solution corresponding to the eigenvalue . While there is no guarantee that  or  will not vanish, the complex function  will never vanish because two linearly-independent solutions of a regular Sturm–Liouville equation cannot vanish simultaneously as a consequence of the Sturm separation theorem. In practice if has real coefficients, the solutions based on  will have very small imaginary parts which must be discarded.

See also
 Normal mode
 Oscillation theory
 Self-adjoint
 Variation of parameters
 Spectral theory of ordinary differential equations
 Atkinson–Mingarelli theorem

References

Further reading 
 
 
  
  (Chapter 5)
  (see Chapter 9 for singular Sturm–Liouville operators and connections with quantum mechanics)
 
  (See Chapter 8, part B, for excerpts from the works of Sturm and Liouville and commentary on them.)
 

Ordinary differential equations
Operator theory
Spectral theory
Partial differential equations
Boundary value problems